Rossburg is an unincorporated community in Spencer Township, Aitkin County, Minnesota, United States. The community is located along 350th Avenue near the junction with Aitkin County Road 5, 360th Street. Nearby places include Aitkin, Glen, and Kimberly. State Highway 47 (MN 47) is nearby.

History
The community had a post office from 1901 to 1937. The post office was first located in postmaster Luigi Digiovanni's store.

References

Unincorporated communities in Aitkin County, Minnesota
Unincorporated communities in Minnesota